Leposternon kisteumacheri is a worm lizard species in the family Amphisbaenidae. It is endemic to Brazil.

References

Leposternon
Reptiles of Brazil
Endemic fauna of Brazil
Reptiles described in 2000
Taxa named by Marcovan Porto
Taxa named by Marcelo Araújo Soares
Taxa named by Ulisses Caramaschi